The Parachute Training School (PTS) is Pakistan Army's training formation imparting basic and advance airborne skills to all ranks. PTS located at Peshawar  was established in 1964 with the help of US Army's 10th Special Forces Group as a wing and was later raised as a school on 22 March 1981.

Courses 
It conducts five parachuting courses:
 Basic Airborne Course
 Jumpmaster and Airborne Operation Course
 High Altitude and Low Opening Course
 Pathfinder Course
 Parachute Packing and Maintenance Course

Aircraft used in training 
 C-130 Hercules
 CASA CN-235
 Mil Mi-17

See also 
 Special Services Group

References 

Airborne units and formations of Pakistan
Aviation in Peshawar
Aviation schools in Pakistan
Organisations based in Peshawar
Training formations of Pakistan Army
Military units and formations established in 1964
Military parachuting schools